The year 1998 in archaeology involved some significant events.

Explorations
 Location of site of Portuguese carrack Esmeralda wrecked off the coast of Oman in 1503.

Excavations
August - Excavation begins at the Belitung shipwreck, an Arab dhow wrecked off Belitung island in Indonesia about 830 AD discovered earlier in the year; it will yield  the biggest single collection of Tang dynasty treasures found in one location.
October - Excavation begins at "Seahenge" ('Holme I'), a prehistoric timber circle off Holme-next-the-Sea in England discovered earlier in the year.
November 5–20 - British female Mark IV tank D51 Deborah, knocked out at the Battle of Cambrai (1917), at Flesquières in the north of France.
Igeum-dong, a settlement-burial-ceremonial site of the Mumun Pottery Period in Sacheon, Korea (excavations finish in 1999).
Excavations at Urkesh by the Deutsche Orient-Gesellschaft.
Excavations begin at Pichvnari in Georgia by an Anglo-Georgian joint team.
Excavations begin at Taposiris Magna in Egypt.

Finds
 September - The largest Shapwick Hoard of Roman coins, including the largest number of silver denarii ever found in Britain.
 Whydah Gally, wrecked off Cape Cod, Massachusetts, in 1717, the first authenticated pirate shipwreck ever discovered.
 Artognou stone found at Tintagel Castle, Cornwall.
 World's oldest wet-rice (rice paddy) agricultural feature, c. 800 BC, at Okhyeon site, Ulsan, Korea.
 Human remains at 36 Craven Street, London, former home of Benjamin Franklin, probably dissected in the anatomy school run here by his friend, surgeon William Hewson, 1772–74.
 A floor mosaic depicting Orpheus is found at Prusias ad Hypium in Turkey.

Publications
 Flemming Kaul - Ships on Bronzes: a study in Bronze Age religion and iconography.
 Ian M. Stead - The Salisbury Hoard.
 Patricia Wattenmaker - Household and State in Upper Mesopotamia: specialized economy and the social uses of goods in an early complex society.

Other events
 Exhibition is held at the Harvard University Semitic Museum, Cambridge, Massachusetts: "The Sphinx and the Pyramids: One Hundred Years of American Archaeology at Giza". A model of the Giza plateau is prepared for it.

Births

Deaths
 April 18 - Linda Schele, American Mayanist (b. 1942)
 May 11 - Vronwy Hankey, British Near Eastern archaeologist (b. 1916)
 November 24 - John Chadwick, English co-decipherer of Linear B (b. 1920)

References

Archaeology
Archaeology by year
Archaeology
1998 archaeological discoveries